Tobias Avery Plants (March 17, 1811 – June 19, 1887) was an American lawyer, newspaperman, and politician who served two terms as a U.S. Representative from Ohio from 1865 to 1869.

Biography 
Born at Sewickley, Pennsylvania, Plants apprenticed to a saddler at the age of twelve.
He received a limited common school education.
He attended Beaver College, Meadville, Pennsylvania.
He taught school, and while teaching studied law with Edwin M. Stanton in the office of Judge David Powell at Steubenville, Ohio.
He was admitted to the bar and commenced practice in Athens, Ohio, in 1846, but soon moved to Pomeroy, Ohio.
He served as member of the State house of representatives 1858–1861.
He was owner and publisher of the Pomeroy Weekly Telegraph about 1860.

Congress 
Plants was elected as a Republican to the Thirty-ninth and Fortieth Congresses (March 4, 1865 - March 3, 1869).  He was not a candidate for renomination in 1868.

Later career and death 
He served as Common Pleas Judge in Meigs County from 1873 to 1875, when he resigned to resume the practice of law.  A presidential elector for Garfield/Arthur in 1880, he served as president of the First City Bank of Pomeroy from 1878 until his death in Pomeroy on June 19, 1887.  He was interred in Beech Grove Cemetery.

Notes

References

1811 births
1887 deaths
People from Sewickley, Pennsylvania
Ohio lawyers
1880 United States presidential electors
19th-century American newspaper publishers (people)
Republican Party members of the Ohio House of Representatives
People from Pomeroy, Ohio
19th-century American journalists
American male journalists
19th-century American male writers
19th-century American politicians
19th-century American lawyers
Republican Party members of the United States House of Representatives from Ohio